Jean Anderson Sterrett (1924-2022 ) is an Australian-American pianist, actor, playwright and composer with careers in music and the dramatic arts.

Early life and education
She was born in Toowoomba, Queensland, Australia, and attended boarding school though her high school graduation at The Brigidine Convent, Sydney Australia. She graduated from Sydney Teachers’ College and was awarded scholarships for three years at the Sydney Conservatorium of Music in Sydney, Australia.  She earned her Licentiate of Music, Australia and Licentiate of the Royal Schools of Music, London.  After World War II, she immigrated to the United States as a war bride to Atlanta, Georgia and later became a naturalized U.S. citizen.  She is a lifetime member of the Dramatists Guild.

Theatrical awards 
 Los Angeles National Repertory Theater Foundation, National Play Award, 1983, "Afternoons at Waratah", selected out of 820 entries.  She was the first female playwright to win this award.
 Mayor's Fellowship in the Arts for Drama, City of Atlanta, GA, 1984, for body of her work
 Harold C. Crain Award, 1986, "The Moebius Band"
 Onassis Foundation - Original Theatrical Plays, Commendation, 2001,“Willie B. Came Into the Sun”
 Essential Theatre, Essential Theatre Playwriting Award, 2007,
 Best Local Playwright, 2007,Creative Loafing, Atlanta, GA, “Fix Me So I Can Stand”, “The Summerhouse in April”

Two-act plays 
 The White Rose of Munich2
 Afternoons at Waratah3,4,5
 The Moebius Band6
 Willie B. Came Into the Sun7
 Fix Me So I Can Stand9,10
 The Summerhouse in April10

Musicals 
 Aphra, the Life and Times of Aphra Behn
 Mow Mow (for young audiences)
 Letters to Charlie
 A Plague in the Palace
 Sing Hurray (song, skit)

Screenplay/Novella
 The Nature of the Whole

One Act Plays 
 H.A. Shahila And Other News
 Shop Till You're Dropped

Acting Roles 
1980s
American Theatre of Actors, NYC, "Afternoons at Waratah" by Jean A. Sterrett, role: Mother
Alabama Shakespeare Festival, Anniston, AL, "All's Well That Ends Well" by William Shakespere, role, Widow Capulet
Underground Theatre, Atlanta, GA, "Dylan", role: Caitlan Thomas
Underground Theatre, Atlanta, GA, "The Silver Cord", role, Mrs. Phelps
Theatrical Outfit, Atlanta, GA, "The Chalk Garden", role, Mrs. St. Maugham
Alliance Studio, Atlanta, GA, "A Perfect Analysis Given By A Parrot" by Tennessee Williams, role, Flora
Seven Stages, Atlanta, GA, "Hamlet Closet Scene, Three Interpretations", role, Gertrude
Barn Dinner Theatre, Atlanta, GA, "Charley's Aunt", role, Dona Lucia Alvarez
Neighborhood Theatre, Atlanta, GA, "Arsenic and Old Lace", role, Abbey
Academy Theatre, Atlanta, GA, "Heavenly Shades of Night Are Falling", role, Janelle
1950s
Various Atlanta Theaters
Idiots Delight, role, Irene
King Lear, role, Cordelia
Gigi, role, Aunt Alicia
The Plough and the Stars, role, Mrs. Gogan
The Happy Time, role, Mother
Ten Little Indians, role, Vera
Witness for the Prosecution, role, Housekeeper
Heartbreak House, role, Lady Utterword
I am a Camera, role, Mummy
The Pursuit of Happiness, role, Meg
There Shall be No Night, role, Miranda
Ring Around the Moon, role, Capulet
The Chalk Garden, role, 1st Applicant
The Bad Seed, role, Miss Fern

Special Acting Skills:
Dialects:  British, Cockney, Irish, Scottish, U.S. Southern, Australian

Prose 
 “Getting to Know the Customs”, The Phoenix, Morning Star Press, 1976, Vol 5, No 3 & 4.
 “The Art of Splice”, Scholia Satyrica, University of South Florida, Winter 1977, Vol 3, number 1.
 “The Nature of the Whole"
 “Going to Gympie”
 “The Eisteddfod”
 “Across the Wall”
 “Autobiography”
 “Weak at a Glance” (Serial)
 “The Core”

Pianist 
 Fox Theatre, Symphonic Variations (written by César Franck) with the Atlanta Pops orchestra.
 Atlanta Symphony Orchestra with Hans Piltz
 Aspen Music Festival
 “Jean Sterrett Pianist”; Volumes 1, 2, and 3; Osiris Studio, Atlanta, GA; 2010

References 

American dramatists and playwrights
American people of Australian descent
 American actors